Welcome to The Welcome Wagon is a folk rock music album by The Welcome Wagon, released in 2008. It was produced by Sufjan Stevens, who also arranged the songs, contributed background vocals and played the banjo and occasionally the piano.

Track listing 
"Up on a Mountain" – 3:34
"Sold! To the Nice Rich Man" – 4:11 (Danielson Famile cover)
"Unless the Lord the House Shall Build" – 1:46
"He Never Said a Mumblin' Word" – 4:38
"Hail to the Lord's Anointed" – 3:36
"But for You Who Fear My Name" – 3:21
"American Legion" – 5:05
"You Made My Day" – 4:01
"Half a Person" – 2:53 (The Smiths Cover)
"Jesus" – 4:30 (Velvet Underground Cover)
"I Am a Stranger" – 6:09
"Deep Were His Wounds, and Red" – 2:17
"Skilled" – 2:08

2008 debut albums
Albums produced by Sufjan Stevens
Asthmatic Kitty albums
The Welcome Wagon albums